Jane Martin is a playwright.

Jane Martin may also refer to:
Jane Roland Martin (born 1929), American professor of philosophy
Jane Martin, leading character in The Blob
Jane Martin, a character in 15 Maiden Lane
Jane Martin (squash player) (born 1972), English squash international
Jane Martin (public servant) (fl. 2021), British former Local Government Ombudsman

See also
Lillien Jane Martin